Vladimír Vacátko (15 September 1952 – 10 September 2016) was a German ice hockey player. He competed in the men's tournament at the 1980 Winter Olympics.

References

1952 births
2016 deaths
German ice hockey players
Olympic ice hockey players of West Germany
Ice hockey players at the 1980 Winter Olympics
Sportspeople from Liberec
Czechoslovak emigrants to Germany